is a passenger railway station located in the city of  Satte, Saitama, Japan, operated by the private railway operator Tōbu Railway.

Lines
Express, Section Express, Semi Express, Section Semi Express, and Local all-stations services stop at this station. Some limited express Kirifuri services also stop here.

Station layout
 
This station consists of two opposed side platforms serving two tracks, connected to the station building by a footbridge.

Platforms

Adjacent stations

History
The station opened on 1 April 1929.

From 17 March 2012, station numbering was introduced on all Tōbu lines, with Satte Station becoming "TN-02".

Passenger statistics
In fiscal 2019, the station was used by an average of 13,574 passengers daily.

Surrounding area
Satte Post Office
 
Sugito-Takanodai Post Office

See also
 List of railway stations in Japan

References

External links

 Tobu station information 

Railway stations in Saitama Prefecture
Stations of Tobu Railway
Tobu Nikko Line
Railway stations in Japan opened in 1929
Satte, Saitama